Ethmia ustyurtensis is a moth in the family Depressariidae. It is found in south-western Kazakhstan. The habitat consists of  calcareous deserts with sparse vegetation.

The forewings are evenly white without markings. The hindwings are white, slightly lustrous.

Etymology
The species name refers to its geographical origin.

References

Moths described in 2015
ustyurtensis